Joseph or Joe Taylor may refer to:

Missionaries
Joseph Taylor (missionary) (died 1859), London Missionary Society missionary in Gujarat, India
J. V. S. Taylor (1820–1881), his son, British missionary in India

Politicians
J. H. Tayler (1859–1959), Wisconsin politician
Joe Taylor (politician), Indiana politician
Joseph D. Taylor (1830–1899), U.S. Representative from Ohio
Joseph Edward Taylor (1830–1913), Utah politician and undertaker
Joseph Walters Taylor (1820–1872), Alabama politician and newspaper editor
Joseph Taylor (died 1746) (c. 1693–1746), British politician
Joseph Taylor (died 1759) (c. 1679–1759), British lawyer and politician

Sportsmen
Joseph Taylor (footballer, born 1850) (1850–1888), 1870s Scottish footballer
Joe Taylor (footballer, 1874-1938), English football centre-half
Joseph Taylor (cricketer) (1886–1954), Australian cricketer
Joseph Taylor (rugby league), rugby league footballer who played in the 1900s and 1910s
Joseph Taylor (wrestler) (1907–1992), British wrestler
Joe Taylor (infielder) (born 1913), baseball second baseman in the Negro leagues
Joe Taylor (outfielder) (1926–1993), American professional baseball outfielder
Joe Taylor (cornerback) (born 1939), former professional American football cornerback
Joe Taylor (American football coach) (born 1950), retired American football coach
Joe Taylor (rugby league, born 1975), rugby league footballer who played in the 1990s
Joe Taylor (rugby league, born 1991), rugby league footballer who played in the 2000s and 2010s
Joseph Taylor (footballer, born 1996), Australian footballer 
Joe Taylor (footballer, born 2002), English football forward

Academics
Joseph T. Taylor (1913–2000), dean of Indiana University
Joseph Hooton Taylor Jr. (born 1941), American astrophysicist and Nobel laureate
Joseph L. Taylor (1941–2016), American mathematician

Others
Joseph W. Taylor (1810–1880), physician and Quaker
Joseph Pannell Taylor (1796–1864), brother of Zachary Taylor, American Civil War general
Joseph Taylor (actor) (died 1652), Richard Burbage's successor with the King's Men
Joey Taylor of the band Undercover
Joseph Taylor (Medal of Honor) (1837–1912), English soldier who helped the Union army during the American Civil War 
Joseph Charles Taylor (died 1837), wine merchant, founder of Taylor, Fladgate, & Yeatman
Joseph Taylor (folk singer), of North Lincolnshire, England 
Joseph Deems Taylor (1885–1966), American composer, music critic, and promoter of classical music